The Family Travel Forum is an Internet community for frequent travelers, focusing on families with children. Of the registered members in the community, 75% are women with children.

The American media company Family Travel Forum Inc. which owns the Forum publishes both print and online travel guides where travel experts and registered members may post trip ideas and advice. The travel website FamilyTravelForum.com includes reviews and information on vacation destinations for families with children of various ages; the site received Travel Weekly's 2009 Magellan Award for Excellence in Online Travel Guides.

History of Family Travel 

Kemmons Wilson, who founded the Holiday Inn brand in 1952, is credited with starting "family  travel" as a hotel concept after a road trip in which his five kids were charged $2 per head per night by motels. The Holiday Inn pioneered policies such as kids sleep free, free parking, ice machines, phone in the room and other perks that are now taken for granted by travelers

Since airfare was so expensive and gas was cheap, roadside motels prospered and today, more than 80% of American family vacations are still by car. However, as far back as 1950, Delta Air Lines sold a "Family Plan" that allowed children under 2 years to fly free with parents. The same year, American Airlines and Northeast Airlines allowed mothers and children to pay half fare when traveling with dad mid-week, while TWA advertised that their air hostesses were trained to help moms with their babies, who flew free of charge.

According to IATA, since 1956 standardized children and infant fares for international travel have meant that one infant less than two years of age not occupying a seat pays 10% of the adult fare as a "lap child." Children under 12 years in their own seat paid a "child's fare" that started at 50% of the adult fare in 1956, and had grown to between 67% to 100% of the full adult fare by 2003.

Today, the U.S. Travel Association defines “family travel” to include many types of traveling parties, including married couples traveling together, spouses traveling with children, grandparents traveling with grandchildren, single parents with children, reunion-goers, siblings with relatives and more.  According to the Ypartnership's National Leisure Travel Monitor, the percentage of adults traveling with their own children has increased from 26% in 2000 to 38% in 2008.

The market for family travel services has continued to grow. The 2010 Portrait of American Travelers revealed that nearly 50% of leisure travelers had taken one trip with children in the past 12 months, and that 41% had taken an average of 2.5 trips. Member of Generation X (born between 1965 and 1978) are twice as likely to travel with children as any other demographic. About 28% of leisure travelers are grandparents and, of them, 32% have taken one or more trips with children in the past 12 months.  More than 89% of these travelers have researched their vacations online and more than 87% have booked them online.

Family Travel Forum started publishing travel advice in 1996. The FTF consulting division has worked with Fairmont Hotels, Chrysler, Forbes, and the Finland Ministry of Tourism. FTF has licensed content to various companies including, among others, hotel, parenting and travel websites such as Travelocity, Discovery Channel, and Disney Family.com.

Awards and recognition

Travel Weekly Magellan Award, Online Travel Guides (2008, 2009)
Recommended in The 4-Hour Workweek by Tim Ferriss (2009)
Web Marketing Association Webaward (2005) 
National Parenting Center Seal of Approval (2000, 2003, 2005) 
Forbes Best of the Web (2001, 2002, 2003) 
Conde Nast Traveler "50 Essential Web Sites" (2000)

References 

American travel websites